William Bennett Campbell,  (August 27, 1943 – September 11, 2008) was a politician and the 24th premier of Prince Edward Island.

Born in Montague, Prince Edward Island, Campbell was a teacher by profession before entering politics in 1970 and was elected to the Legislative Assembly of Prince Edward Island as a Liberal candidate. In 1972, he became Minister of Education; Provincial Secretary in 1974; and Minister of Finance in 1976.

When Liberal leader and PEI Premier Alexander B. Campbell (no relation) announced his retirement, Bennett Campbell was elected interim leader of the PEI Liberal Party by the caucus and was sworn in as premier on September 18, 1978. On December 9, he was elected leader at the party's leadership convention.

His government was defeated in the general election held the next year. He remained party leader and leader of the opposition until he decided to enter federal politics. He won the seat for Cardigan in the House of Commons of Canada through a 1981 by-election following the death of Daniel J. MacDonald. On September 22, 1981, he took over Macdonald's cabinet portfolio and became Minister of Veterans Affairs in the government of Prime Minister Pierre Trudeau. He retained his portfolio when John Turner succeeded Trudeau as Liberal leader and prime minister, but lost his seat to Pat Binns in the 1984 election that brought down the short-lived Turner government.

In the 1986 provincial election, Campbell attempted to regain his former district of 3rd Kings, but lost to Progressive Conservative incumbent Joey Fraser by 16 votes.

On September 11, 2008, Campbell died of cancer.

Electoral record

References

External links
 

1943 births
2008 deaths
Deaths from cancer in Prince Edward Island
Liberal Party of Canada MPs
Members of the House of Commons of Canada from Prince Edward Island
Members of the King's Privy Council for Canada
People from Kings County, Prince Edward Island
Premiers of Prince Edward Island
Prince Edward Island Liberal Party MLAs
Prince Edward Island Liberal Party leaders
Members of the 23rd Canadian Ministry